Fortune Dane is an American crime drama series that aired at 9 p.m. Eastern Time on ABC from February 15 to March 27, 1986. 
It stars Carl Weathers as the title character. It was cancelled after only six episodes, due to low ratings after failing to compete with NBC's The Golden Girls and 227. As of 2021, the series is available to stream on Crackle.

Synopsis 
Fortune Dane is a former policeman who works as a special agent for the mayor in Bay City.

Cast 
 Carl Weathers as Detective Fortune Dane
 Daphne Ashbrook as "Speed" Davenport
 Joe Dallesandro as Tommy "Perfect Tommy" Nicautri  
 Penny Fuller as Amanda Harding
 Alberta Watson as Amy Steiner

Episodes

References

External links 

1980s American drama television series
American Broadcasting Company original programming
1986 American television series debuts
1986 American television series endings
English-language television shows
Television shows set in California